Peter William David Mack  (born April 1955) was director of The Warburg Institute from  2010 to 2015. He succeeded Charles Hope and was succeeded by David Freedberg. He is a specialist in the history of rhetoric and was formerly professor of English at the University of Warwick.

Selected publications
Renaissance Argument: Valla and Agricola in the Traditions of Rhetoric and Dialectic (Leiden, 1993)
Elizabethan Rhetoric: Theory and Practice (Cambridge, 2002)
A History of Renaissance Rhetoric 1380-1620 (Oxford, 2011)

References 

1955 births
Academics of the University of Warwick
Directors of the Warburg Institute
Fellows of the British Academy
Living people